Let Go is the second release by American melodic hardcore band Hundredth. It was released on September 27, 2011, through Mediaskare Records. "Live Today" was the first single from the record, and was released on YouTube on July 22, 2011.

Critical reception
Alternative Press wrote: "Nihilistic statements are eschewed in favor of motivating both themselves and their listeners to stand up and do something about the negativity surrounding them—a message that has typified hardcore for nearly 30 years and remains just as vital." MetalSucks called the album "generic metalcore," writing that "the lack of any real thought makes the record suffer."

Track listing

Notes 
 Track 12 contains an outro excerpt from "There is a Light that Never Goes Out" by The Smiths.

Personnel
Hundredth
Chadwick Johnson - Vocals
Alex Blackwell - Lead guitar, Backing vocals
Andrew Minervini - Rhythm guitar
J. P. Gressman - Bass
Matt Koontz - Drums

Production
Produced by  Baron Bodnar, Ryan Leitru & Hundredth
Engineered by Taylor Voeltz, Chadwick Johnson & Alex Blackwell
Adaptation by Johnny Cash
Mixed and Mastered by Will Putney
Management by Baron Bodnar
Booking by Cody Delong (The Kenmore Agency, US) & Nanouk De Meijere (Avocado Booking, EU)
PR by Josh Eldridge
Artwork by Dan Mountford & John Doe

References

External links
www.musicdirect.com

2011 albums
Hundredth (band) albums
Mediaskare Records albums